The New York Empire is an ultimate team in the American Ultimate Disc League based in New York City. The team is in the East Division of the league, and won its first AUDL title in 2019 and its second in 2022. The Empire played its first season in 2013.

History
At the beginning of the Empire's history in late 2012, the team almost did not come to fruition, as part-owner Cullen Shaw almost took his Ultimate ownership interest to Major League Ultimate because of a pending AUDL lawsuit against the Connecticut Constitution and Rhode Island Rampage. However, Shaw kept with the AUDL and the Empire because of lower ownership costs and more abilities as a team owner. The Empire's first tryout, in January 2013, attracted 60 players, more than other teams holding initial tryouts. The MLU did eventually create a New York franchise, the New York Rumble, and the Empire became the first AUDL team to have a player play for an AUDL and MLU team in the same year when Isaac Saul joined the Empire in 2014 after the conclusion of the Rumble season that same year.

After the 2017 season, Barbara Stevens, mother of then-Empire player Matthew Stevens, became majority owner of the team. Before the 2018 season, the Empire signed Beau Kittredge and Marques Brownlee, and before 2019, the Empire signed Jack Williams and Grant Lindsley. These signings, combined with existing talent like Jeff Babbitt and Ben Jagt, combined to create a team that some called the strongest in the league since the 2016 iteration of the Dallas Roughnecks. The Empire then proceeded to go 12–0 in the regular season after close calls with Raleigh and DC, and went 3–0 in the playoffs to win the 2019 championship and become only the third team in league history to finish a season undefeated.

Stadium
The Empire formerly played its home games at MCU Park in the borough of Brooklyn, with some contests being played on Randall's Island. Before the 2018 season, the Empire moved to Joseph F. Fosina Field in New Rochelle, citing a lack of locker rooms and concessions at Randall's Island as well as better proximity to major thoroughways.

Record

References

External links
 Official Website

Ultimate (sport) teams
Ultimate teams established in 2013
2013 establishments in New York City
Sports teams in New York City